Kengesh is a village in Kara-Kulja District, Osh Region, southern Kyrgyzstan. Its population was 2,763 in 2021. It is situated near the confluence of the rivers Tar and Kara-Kulja. In 2011 it made headlines after announcing it would begin staging its own criminal law trials due to dissatisfaction with the  Kyrgyz legal system.

See also
Courts of Kyrgyzstan

References

Populated places in Osh Region